Vector Informatik develops software tools and components for networking of electronic systems based on the serial bus systems CAN, LIN, FlexRay, MOST, Ethernet, AFDX, ARINC 429, and SAE J1708 as well as on CAN-based protocols such as SAE J1939, SAE J1587, ISO 11783, NMEA 2000, ARINC 825, CANaerospace, CANopen and more. The headquarters of the company Vector Informatik GmbH is in Stuttgart, Germany. Subsidiaries include Braunschweig, Munich, Hamburg, Regensburg along with international subsidiaries in Brazil, China, France, Italy, England, India, Japan, South Korea, Austria, Sweden, and the United States. Vector Informatik also includes Vector Consulting Services GmbH, a consulting firm specializing in the optimization of technical product development. Altogether, these companies are referred to as the Vector Group.

History 
Vector Software GmbH was founded on April 1, 1988, by Eberhard Hinderer, Martin Litschel, and Helmut Schelling. In the year 1992, the company changed its name to Vector Informatik GmbH. In the same year, the first CANalyzer license was sold and the company attained sales of one million Euros for the first time. In 1996, the first CANoe and CANape licenses were sold.

In 1998, Vector CANtech (United States) was founded, and in the following year Vector Japan. In 2001, the subsidiary Vector Consulting GmbH was founded, which offers consulting services for engineering development and its cost-effectiveness. In 2006, Vector Informatik acquired "Division 4m Software" from Micron Electronic Devices AG. In the same year, sales of the Vector Group exceeded the 100 million Euro mark for the first time. In the following year, Vector Korea was founded, and in 2009 Vector Great Britain, Vector Informatik India, and Vector China. 2011 the previous representation office in China was converted into a legally independent business. In August 2011 the four owners of Vector Informatik GmbH have transferred their business shares to a family foundation and a non-profit foundation. In 2013, a new subsidiary Vector Austria was established, followed 2014 by Vector Brasil and Vector Italy.

In February 2017, Vector Informatik has acquired 100% of the US company Vector Software, Inc., which develops an embedded software testing platform VectorCAST.

In June 2018, Vector Informatik has acquired 100% of the French company Squoring Technologies SAS, which develops the Squore software analytics platform.

In March 2022, Vector Informatik acquired 100% of the assets of the US company, Gimpel Software LLC, a producer of static analysis software.

Fields of activity 
Vector handles networking of electronic systems based on the serial bus systems CAN, LIN, FlexRay and MOST as well as CAN-based protocols such as SAE J1939 and CANopen. Electronic control modules in vehicles are the company's focus. Experience gained in this area has also been applied to other areas such as avionics, heavy-duty vehicles, special machines, and embedded systems in general. A selection of articles and case studies provides additional background:
 Automatic validation of diagnostic services with GM Europe
 FlexRay tools support PDU based comms
 Optimizing driver assistance systems at BMW
 XCP-on-FlexRay at Audi
 ODX process from the perspective of an automotive supplier (ZF)
 Car2x/DSRC communication

Products 
Some of the company's key products are:
 The CANalyzer analysis tool for CAN, FlexRay, Ethernet, LIN, and MOST as well as other CAN-based protocols.
 The CANoe development tool with support for simulation, diagnostics, and as a test tool for automotive ECUs. Used at most automotive and truck OEMs and suppliers.
 CANape development software, widely used by OEMs and ECU suppliers of automotive industries to calibrate algorithms in ECUs at runtime.
 Embedded software components for CAN, FlexRay, LIN, AUTOSAR, and others. These components can be found on nearly all automobiles with networked electronics throughout the world.

References 

Software companies of Germany
Electronics companies of Germany
Companies based in Stuttgart
Automotive companies of Germany